Hexamethyldisiloxane (HMDSO) is an organosilicon compound with the formula O[Si(CH3)3]2.  This volatile colourless liquid is used as a solvent and as a reagent in organic synthesis.  It is prepared by the hydrolysis of trimethylsilyl chloride.  The molecule is the protypical disiloxane and resembles a subunit of polydimethylsiloxane.

Synthesis and reactions
Hexamethyldisiloxane can be produced by addition of trimethylsilyl chloride to purified water:

 2 Me3SiCl + H2O → 2 HCl + O[Si(CH3)3]2

It also results from the hydrolysis of silylethers and other silyl-protected functional groups.  HMDSO can be converted back to the chloride by reaction with Me2SiCl2.

Hexamethyldisiloxane is mainly used as source of the trimethylsilyl functional group (-Si(CH3)3) in organic synthesis.  For example, in the presence of acid catalyst, it converts alcohols and carboxylic acids into the silyl ethers and silyl esters, respectively.

It reacts with rhenium(VII) oxide to give a siloxide:
 Re2O7 + O[Si(CH3)3]2 → 2 O3ReOSi(CH3)3

Niche uses
HMDSO is used as an internal standard for calibrating chemical shift in1H NMR spectroscopy. It is more easily handled since it is less volatile than the usual standard tetramethylsilane but still displays only a singlet near 0ppm.

HMDSO has even poorer solvating power than alkanes.  It is therefore sometimes employed to crystallize highly lipophilic compounds.

It is used in liquid bandages (spray on plasters) such as cavilon spray, to protect damaged skin from irritation from other bodily fluids.  It is also used to soften and remove adhesive residues left by medical tape and bandages, without causing further skin irritation.

HMDSO is being studied for making low-k dielectric materials for the semi-conductor industries by plasma-enhanced chemical vapor deposition (PECVD).

HMDSO has been used as a reporter molecule to measure tissue oxygen tension (pO). HMDSO is highly hydrophobic and exhibits high gas solubility, and hence strong nuclear magnetic resonance spin lattice relaxation rate (R1) response to changes in pO. Molecular symmetry provides a single NMR signal. Following direct injection into tissues it has been used to generate maps of tumor and muscle oxygenation dynamics with respect to hyperoxic gas breathing challenge.

References

Siloxanes
Trimethylsilyl compounds